Jean-Michel Carré (born 26 July 1948) is a French director, cinematographer, producer, and screenwriter.
Carré studied medicine before joining the film school IDHEC, where he obtained diplomas in directing and cinematography. He went on to found his own production company, Les Films Grain de Sable.

Selected filmography
 Kursk: A Submarine in Troubled Waters (2004)
 The Putin System (2007)
 Les travailleu(r)ses du sexe (2009)
 China, The New Empire (2011)
 Les 18 du 57, Boulevard de  Strasbourg (2014)
 Putin, the New Empire (2018)
 Chine, un miliion d'artistes (2018)
 Royal de Luxe (2018)

References

External links
 

French television directors
French film directors
Living people
1948 births